The Secretary of the Central Committee of the League of Communists of Serbia was the head of the League of Communists of Serbia, heading the Central Committee of the Party. The holder of the office was, for a significant period, the de facto most influential politician in the Socialist Republic of Serbia, a constituent republic of Yugoslavia. The official name of the office was changed in May 1982 from "Secretary of the Central Committee" to President of the Presidency of the Central Committee of the League of Communists of Serbia (Predsednik Predsedništva Centralnog komiteta Saveza komunista Srbije).

The League of Communists of Serbia was also an organization subordinate to the federal-level League of Communists of Yugoslavia. Between 1941 and September 1952, the former was named the Communist Party of Serbia (being part of the larger Communist Party of Yugoslavia), until both parties were renamed "League of Communists" in 1952.

List of presidents of the League of Communists of Serbia 
People's Republic of Serbia / Socialist Republic of Serbia / Communist Party of Serbia / League of Communists of Serbia

Here follows a list of the eleven officeholders:

 (15)

See also
League of Communists of Serbia
League of Communists of Yugoslavia
Socialist Republic of Serbia
President of Serbia
List of presidents of Serbia
Prime Minister of Serbia
President of the National Assembly of Serbia
List of heads of state of Yugoslavia
Prime Minister of Yugoslavia
Politics of Serbia

References

Communism in Serbia
League of Communists of Serbia politicians